Shishir Inocalla is a practitioner of Filipino martial arts, Yoga and meditation. He was the first of 6 men named as Datu (meaning a chieftain or leader) by the late Remy Presas, Founder of Modern Arnis. He is an accomplished martial artist, Yogi as well as noted actor with movie credits including: Ninja Turtles, Pinoy Boxer, Five Style Fist, Crazy Kung Fu and The Ultimate Fight. [9] [10]He played “Michaelangelo” in Teenage Mutant Ninja turtle 3 Movie and TV series.  is also a balisong expert and Hilot healer. [4.]Master Shishir Inocalla became the mind body inner heart trainer for David Leadbetter golf Academy in Championsgate since 2003 and Zone golf Academy in Richmond, BC Canada. He created Arnis chigolf  and  heartful training from the heart. [5]He co star and co produced “The Process” aka “ultimate Fight” movie. [6]He revived Modern Arnis In the Philippines under GM Remy Presas and became President of Modern Arnis. Canada and Vice President of International Arnis Federation Iarnis (member of Philippine Sports Commission and Philippine Olympic Committee). He also formed Sport Arnis to be approved sport in Canada, USA, Brazil and other countries www.Sportarniscanad.org. Together with his family They Created Maharlika Institute for higher learning and www.paracalegoldcorp.com creating self sufficient agro-green mining in his family farm Paracale/Mambulao, Camarines Norte, Philippines.  www.mastershishir.com

[7]Master Shishir Inocalla created and produced several books and videos in Arnis, Yoga, Meditation, Chigolf, Sport Arnis, MFMA community with the mission of "Self realization and service.

Sources 
4. Celebration Life Magazine - Oct. 15, 2006

5. Burnaby Now Metro Canada edition- April 24-30, 1996

6. Manila standard “Action star-movie producer launches arnis club here” Nov. 23, 1996

7. Florida Today “the Verge” July 9, 2006

8. Philippine Journal - January 16-31, 2002

9. The Philippine Reporter “Pinoy stars in Ninja Turtle movie” April 1-15, 1993

10. Burnaby now “Michaelangelo” opens the door - Sept. 22, 1993

 Video: Balisong, Knife Fighting Art of The Philippine Islands, Shishir Inocalla.

External links 
 

Filipino male martial artists
Martial arts school founders
Living people
Year of birth missing (living people)